Karama is an electoral division of the Legislative Assembly in Australia's Northern Territory. It was first created in 1987, and derives its name from the suburb of the same name. It is an urban electorate, covering 8 km2 and taking in the Darwin suburbs of Karama and Malak, as well as parts of Berrimah and Marrara. There were 5,482 people enrolled within the electorate as of August 2020.

The Country Liberal Party's Mick Palmer won the seat in 1987, and as the incumbent member during the height of the CLP's dominance of Territory politics, had little trouble holding the seat through the next three elections. Until the 2000s, it was almost unheard of for a sitting member to be defeated, so few thought Palmer would face much difficulty gaining a fourth term at the 2001 election. However, the Labor Party swept through the northern suburbs of Darwin and Palmer was unexpectedly defeated by the ALP candidate, Delia Lawrie, the daughter of former long-serving independent MP Dawn Lawrie. Lawrie's victory created the first mother-daughter political dynasty in Australian politics, and she soon established herself in the electorate. She was easily re-elected at the 2005 election, significantly increasing her majority. Lawrie was disendorsed by the Labor Party in October 2015, and she resigned from the party a few days later. She nominated as an independent candidate for Karama at the 2016 election, against the preselected Labor candidate, Ngaree Ah Kit. Ah Kit defeated Lawrie at said election and has held the seat ever since.

Members for Karama

Election results

References

External links
Division profile from the Northern Territory Electoral Commission

Karama